Horkheimer is a German surname. Notable people with the surname include:

 Jack Horkheimer (1938–2010), American astronomer and television host
 Max Horkheimer (1895–1973), German philosopher and sociologist

See also
 11409 Horkheimer

German-language surnames